The Girl In My Life is an American daytime television show spotlighting women who made a difference in people's lives. The show was hosted by Fred Holliday and the announcers were Bob Warren and John Harlan. The program aired on ABC during 1973 and 1974. The show was created by William T. Naud. It replaced the original version of The Dating Game on ABC's weekday schedule, afternoons at 2:30 p.m. Eastern Time.

Format
Each day on the show featured three to four vignettes of women. The woman would come out on stage and be interviewed by Holliday, and then would receive a modest prize package or an item of special meaning to the woman.

The show's format was spoofed in an episode of The Carol Burnett Show, using the knockoff title "The Girl That We Like".

Episode status
The series was not rerun after its original network run and is believed lost. One pilot program that used a different musical theme aired near the middle of the series' run.

References

External links

1973 American television series debuts
1974 American television series endings
American Broadcasting Company original programming
Lost television shows